Albinaria is a genus of air-breathing land snails, terrestrial pulmonate gastropod mollusks in the family Clausiliidae, the door snails.

Ecology and Life Cycle 
The snails live on limestone rocks, where they feed on algae and lichen. They are active only during the wet season, that is, in Mediterranean lowlands, from November through April. Eggs are laid shortly after the beginning of the wet season. The development from a juvenile to a fully grown shell takes two to three wet seasons. During the intermittent dry seasons, the snails, young and adults alike, aestivate ("the warm weather equivalent of hibernation") on the rocks or in crevices inside the rocks. For aestivation, aggregates are often formed, sometimes reaching sizes of many hundreds of individuals. During the last dry season prior to sexual maturation, the subadult snail (the shell of which is already fully developed, albeit thinner than that of an adult) increases the size of its genital organs. Copulation then takes place during the first weeks of autumn rains. Population densities can sometimes be very high, in spite of heavy predation by beetle larvae of the genus Drilus. These insects attack the snails during their aestivation, by perforating the shell and eating the snail inside.

Distribution 
Distribution of the genus Albinaria includes:
 southern Albania
 Greece
 Cyprus
 western and southern Turkey
 Lebanon

Species
Species in this genus include 111 species:

 Albinaria adrianae Gittenberger, 1979
 Albinaria adriani (Gittenberger, 1987)
 Albinaria alajana (Boettger, 1896)
 Albinaria amalthea (Westerlund, 1878)
 Albinaria anatolica (Roth, 1839)
 Albinaria arcadica (Boettger, 1878)
 Albinaria argynnis (Westerlund, 1898)
 Albinaria ariadne Schilthuizen & Gittenberger, 1991
 Albinaria arthuriana (Boettger, 1878)
 Albinaria avia (Charpentier, 1852)
 Albinaria basalifera Neubert, 1992
 Albinaria bigibbosula (Westerlund, 1878)
 Albinaria brevicollis (Pfeiffer, 1850)
 Albinaria broemmei (Boettger, 1892)
 Albinaria butoti (Nordsieck, 1984)
 Albinaria caerulea (Deshayes, 1835)
 Albinaria campylauchen (Boettger, 1883)
 Albinaria candida (Pfeiffer, 1850)
 Albinaria cerigottana (Boettger, 1894)
 Albinaria christae Wiese, 1989 
 Albinaria compressa (Pfeiffer, 1850)
 Albinaria confusa (Boettger, 1878)
 Albinaria contaminata (Rossmässler, 1835)
 Albinaria corrugata (Bruguière, 1792)
 Albinaria cretensis (Rossmässler, 1836)
 Albinaria cristatella (Küster, 1861)
 Albinaria cytherae (Boettger, 1894)
 Albinaria discolor (Pfeiffer, 1846)
 Albinaria eburnea (Pfeiffer, 1854)
 Albinaria edmundi (Gittenberger, 1987)
 Albinaria evelynae Gittenberger, 1998
 Albinaria forbesiana (Pfeiffer, 1846)
 Albinaria freytagi (Boettger, 1889)
 Albinaria fuchskaeufeli Nordsieck, 1977
 Albinaria gerolimena Nordsieck, 1974
 Albinaria grayana (Pfeiffer, 1846)
 Albinaria greeni Tomlin, 1935
 Albinaria grisea (Deshayes, 1835)
 Albinaria haessleini Fauer, 1978
 Albinaria hians (Boettger, 1878)
 Albinaria hippolyti (Boettger, 1878)
 Albinaria hohorsti Nordsieck, 1984
 Albinaria idaea (Pfeiffer, 1850)
 Albinaria idyllica (Gittenberger, 1987)
 Albinaria ietswaarti Gittenberger & Menkhorst, 1992
 Albinaria inauris (Boettger, 1896)
 Albinaria ithomensis Nordsieck, 1984
 Albinaria jaeckeli Wiese, 1989
 Albinaria janicollis Schultes & Wiese, 1991
 Albinaria janisadana Loosjes, 1955
 Albinaria jonica (Pfeiffer, 1866)
 Albinaria kemerensis Nordsieck, 1993
 Albinaria klemmi Paget, 1971
 Albinaria krueperi (Pfeiffer, 1866)
 Albinaria latelamellaris Neubert, Örstan & Welter-Schultes, 2000
 Albinaria lerosiensis (Pfeiffer, 1841)
 Albinaria li Welter-Schultes, 1999
 Albinaria linnei Gittenberger, 2008
 Albinaria litoraria Neubert, 1998
 Albinaria lycica Nordsieck, 1993
 Albinaria maculosa (Deshayes, 1835)
 Albinaria maltzani (Böttger, 1883)
 Albinaria manselli (Boettger, 1883)
 Albinaria mavromoustakisi Brandt, 1961
 Albinaria menelaus (Martens, 1873)
 Albinaria mixta Nordsieck, 1984
 Albinaria monocristata Neubert, 1992
 Albinaria moreletiana (Boettger, 1878)
 Albinaria munda (Rossmässler, 1836)
 Albinaria myrensis Nordsieck, 1993
 Albinaria nadimi Tohme & Tohme, 1988
 Albinaria nivea (Pfeiffer, 1854)
 Albinaria olivieri (Roth, 1839)
 Albinaria papillifera Nordsieck, 1993
 Albinaria pellucida Nordsieck, 1993
 Albinaria pelocarinata Gittenberger, 1994
 Albinaria percristata Nordsieck, 1993
 Albinaria petrosa (Pfeiffer, 1849)
 Albinaria praeclara (Pfeiffer, 1853)
 Albinaria profuga (Charpentier, 1852)
 Albinaria proteus (Boettger, 1889)
 Albinaria puella (Pfeiffer, 1850)
 Albinaria rebeli Wagner, 1924
 Albinaria rechingeri Paget, 1971
 Albinaria retusa (Olivier, 1801)
 Albinaria rollei (Boettger, 1896)
 Albinaria saxatilis (Pfeiffer, 1846)
 Albinaria schuetti Nordsieck, 1984
 Albinaria scopulosa (Charpentier, 1852)
 Albinaria senilis (Rossmässler, 1836)
 Albinaria solicola Neubert, 1998
 Albinaria sphakiota (Maltzan, 1887)
 Albinaria spratti (Pfeiffer, 1846)
 Albinaria staudingeri (Boettger, 1890)
 Albinaria sturanyi Wagner, 1924
 Albinaria subaii (Nordsieck, 1984)
 Albinaria sublamellosa (Boettger, 1883)
 Albinaria supercarinata Gittenberger & Menkhorst, 1992
 Albinaria tenuicostata (Pfeiffer, 1864)
 Albinaria terebra (Pfeiffer, 1853)
 Albinaria teres (Olivier, 1801)
 Albinaria thiesseae (Boettger, 1880)
 Albinaria torticollis (Olivier, 1801)
 Albinaria turrita (Pfeiffer, 1850)
 Albinaria violacea Schilthuizen & Gittenberger, 1990
 Albinaria virgo (Mousson, 1854)
 Albinaria voithii (Rossmässler, 1836)
 Albinaria wettsteini Fuchs & Käufel, 1936
 Albinaria wiesei Gittenberger, 1988
 Albinaria xanthostoma (Böttger, 1883)
 Albinaria zilchi Fauer, 1993

References

Further reading 
 .
 Kemperman Th. C. M. (1992). "Genitalia of Albinaria of the Ionian islands Kephallinia and Ithaka". In: Kemperman Th. C. M. Systematics and evolutionary history of the Albinaria species from the Ionian islands of Kephallinia and Ithaka (Gastropoda Pulmonata: Clausiliidae): 41-80. Leiden, thesis Leiden University.
 Schilthuizen M. & Gittenberger E. (1996). "Allozyme variation in some Cretan Albinaria (Gastropoda): paraphyletic species as natural phenomena". In: Taylor J. D. (ed.) Origin and evolutionary radiation of the Mollusca: 301-311. Oxford University Press, Oxford.
 
 .

External links 
 http://wwwuser.gwdg.de/~fwelter/research.htm
 http://www.animalbase.uni-goettingen.de/zooweb/servlet/AnimalBase/home/genus?id=1